Benny Carter Plays Pretty (also released as Moonglow) is an album by jazz saxophonist Benny Carter that was recorded in 1954 and released by Norgran Records.

Billboard in 1955 wrote: "This is mainly 'mood music' in the jazz idiom, and highly effective."

Reception

Allmusic awarded the album 3 stars.

Track listing

Personnel 
 Benny Carter – alto saxophone
 Don Abney (tracks 1-5, 7 & 8) – piano
 Oscar Peterson (track 6) – piano
 George Duvivier (track 1-5, 7 & 8) – double bass
 Ray Brown (track 6) – double bass
 Louis Bellson (tracks 1-5, 7 & 8) – drums
 Buddy Rich (track 6) – drums
 Herb Ellis (track 6) – guitar
 Bill Harris (track 6) – trombone

References 

1955 albums
Benny Carter albums
Norgran Records albums
Verve Records albums
Albums produced by Norman Granz